The slaty-mantled goshawk (Accipiter luteoschistaceus), also known as the slaty-mantled sparrowhawk or slaty-backed sparrowhawk, is a species of bird of prey in the family Accipitridae. It is endemic to the Bismarck Archipelago (Papua New Guinea). Its natural habitat is subtropical or tropical moist lowland forest. It is threatened by habitat loss.

References

BirdLife Species Factsheet.

Accipiter
Birds of the Bismarck Archipelago
Birds of prey of New Guinea
Birds described in 1926
Taxonomy articles created by Polbot